Do Dooni Char is a 1968 Bollywood musical, which is a remake of the 1963 Bengali film  Bhranti Bilas based on the 1869 play of same name by Ishwar Chandra Vidyasagar which was loosely based on William Shakespeare's The Comedy of Errors. The movie was remade by Gulzar as Angoor and was again adapted by Rohit Shetty as Cirkus.

Plot
When a banker and his assistant head to a small town on a business trip, they are mistaken for a merchant and his servant who live in the town, causing much confusion.

Cast
Kishore Kumar as Sandeep
Tanuja as Anju
Surekha as Suman
Asit Sen as Sevak
Sudha Rani as Pyari
Iftekhar as Police Inspector
Rashid Khan 		
Neetu Singh as Ban Devi

Soundtrack 
The music of the film was composed by Hemant Kumar, while lyrics were penned by Gulzar.

References

External links
 
 

1968 films
1960s Hindi-language films
Modern adaptations of works by William Shakespeare
Films based on The Comedy of Errors
Films scored by Hemant Kumar
Hindi remakes of Bengali films